Trachylepis affinis, the Senegal mabuya, is a species of skink found in Africa.

References

Trachylepis
Reptiles of Namibia
Reptiles of Angola
Reptiles described in 1838
Taxa named by John Edward Gray